The Pullenvale Ward is a Brisbane City Council ward covering Pullenvale, Anstead, Bellbowrie, Brookfield, Karana Downs, Kenmore, Kenmore Hills, Kholo, Lake Manchester, Moggill, Mt Crosby, Pinjarra Hills, Upper Brookfield and parts of Chapel Hill and Chuwar.

Councillors for Pullenvale Ward

Results

References 

City of Brisbane wards